Vinny or Vinnie is a masculine given name, usually a shortened version of Vincent, Vincenzo, or Vicente, which may refer to:

Vincents
 Vinnie Anderson (born 1979), New Zealand rugby league footballer
 Vinny Appice (born 1957), American rock drummer
 Vinnie Bell (1932–2019), American session guitarist
 Vinnie Clark (born 1969), American former National Football League player
 Vinnie Colaiuta (born 1956), American drummer
 Vincent Cusano (born 1952), stage name Vinnie Vincent, American rock/metal guitarist, formerly with Kiss
 Vinny Del Negro (born 1966), American retired National Basketball Association player and head coach
 Vinnie Doyle (1938-2010), Irish journalist and editor
 Vinny Faherty (born 1987), Irish footballer
 Vinny Guadagnino (born 1987), American reality television personality and actor best known for his appearances on Jersey Shore
 Vinnie Hinostroza (born 1994) American National Hockey League player
 Vinnie Johnson (born 1956), American retired National Basketball Association player
 Vinnie Jones (born 1965), British actor and former footballer
 Vinnie Moore (born 1964), American guitarist and member of the English hard rock band UFO
 Vincent "Vinny" Parco, star of the reality television program Parco P.I.
 Vinnie Paul (1964–2018), American rock/metal drummer, founding member of the band Pantera
 Vincent Richards (1903-1959), American tennis player
 Vinny Rottino (born 1980), American Major League Baseball utility player
 Vinny Samways (born 1968), English former footballer and manager
 Vinnie Sunseri (born 1991), American National Football League player
 Vinny Testaverde (born 1963), American former National Football League quarterback

Indeterminate 
 Vinny Burns (born 1965), English hard rock guitarist and producer
 Vinny Cerrato, National Football League executive and former football player
 Vinny Curry (born 1988), American National Football League player
 Vinny Finigan (born 1989), English rugby league player
 Vinny Golia (born 1946), American composer and musician
 Vinny Lingham (born 1979), South African Internet entrepreneur
 Vinny Vella (born 1950), American actor
 Vinny Warren, American advertising creative director best known for his iconic Budweiser "Whassup?" campaign

Other
 Vinny Arora, stage name of Indian television actress born Harmeet Kaur in 1991
 Vinnie Barrett (born Gwendolyn Hines Woolfolk in 1945), American songwriter and musician
 Vinicio Vinny Castilla (born 1967), Mexican-born former Major League Baseball player
 Mark Vinnie Dombroski (born 1962), American lead vocalist and main songwriter for the alternative rock band Sponge
 Marvin Vinny Giles (born 1943), American amateur golfer
 Viriato Vinny deMacedo (born 1965), American politician
 Vincenzo Luvineri (born 1977), stage name Vinnie Paz, Italian-American rapper and lyricist
 Vinicius Vinny Magalhães (born 1984), Brazilian mixed martial artist
 Vincenzo Vinny Paz (born 1962), American former boxer and world champion in several weight classes
 Václav Prospal (born 1975), Czech retired National Hockey League player
 Lavinia Vinnie Ream (1847-1914), American sculptor
 Quoc Al Vinny Vinh, Vietnamese-American professional poker player
 Ventan Vinnie Yablonski (1923-2008), American National Football League player

Fictional characters
 The title character of the film My Cousin Vinny, played by Joe Pesci
 Vinnie Kruse, on the New Zealand soap opera Shortland Street
 Vinnie Monks, on the BBC soap opera EastEnders
 Vinny Panesar, on the BBC soap opera EastEnders
 Vinny Dingle, on the ITV soap opera Emmerdale
 Vinnie Terrio, in the cartoon Littlest Pet Shop
 Vinnie Patterson, on the Australian soap opera Home and Away
 Vinny or Vince Wolek, on the American soap opera One Life to Live
 Vinnie, the main antagonist of the video game Grand Theft Auto Advance

See also
 Vinni, stage name of Norwegian musician Øyvind Sauvik (born 1976)
 Vinni Lettieri (born 1995), American ice hockey player
 Vinni, Estonia, a settlement
 Vinni Parish, Estonia

Masculine given names
Hypocorisms
English masculine given names